Sreemoolanagaram is a small town near Aluva and is a part of the Sreemoolanagaram Grama Panchayat. The Panchayat is a part of Aluva Taluk in Ernakulam District in Kerala, India. The Chowara village is a part of Sreemoolanagaram Panchayat.

Since the history of Kerala is of minor importance but has gone unnoticed, Chowara, Sreemoolanagaram and Vellarappilly Kanjoor are the villages where history falls asleep.  These names are sometimes mentioned in mainstream historical texts, but they are not given much importance.  In many ways, these lands provide great backgrounds for movements, the arts, and the elite.

References 

Villages in Ernakulam district